Hélio Hermito Zampier Neto (born 16 August 1985), commonly known as Neto, is a Brazilian retired footballer, and is the football superintendent of Chapecoense. 

Formerly a central defender, Neto is one of just six survivors in the crash of LaMia Flight 2933, which killed 71 people including 19 Chapecoense players.

Personal life
His father is called Helam Marinho Zampier. His mother was born as Valéria dos Santos and added Zampier at the end of her full name after her marriage with Helam. The word Neto (Portuguese for "grandson") was added in Hélio's full name as his paternal grandfather was called Hélio Hermito Zampier too.

Club career

Early career
Born in Rio de Janeiro, Neto played youth football for Paraná Clube, Vasco da Gama and Francisco Beltrão (twice), making his senior debuts with the latter in 2006 Campeonato Paranaense. After being captain in the following years, he moved to Cianorte in 2008.

Guarani
On 1 October 2009 Neto joined Guarani. After being loaned to Metropolitano in late 2010, he established himself as a regular for Bugre, and on 7 June 2012, renewed his link with the club.

Santos
On 8 November 2012 Neto moved to Santos, signing a two-year deal. After a 2013 season marred by injuries (also hindered by the emergence of Gustavo Henrique), he was given more first-team opportunities in 2014, after the latter and Edu Dracena (both regular starters) suffered knee injuries.

Neto was again demoted as a backup after Dracena's recovery and David Braz's ascension, and opted to not renew his link with Peixe, and thus left the club after his link expired.

Chapecoense
On 12 February 2015, Neto signed a one-year contract with fellow top tier club Chapecoense. After struggling with injuries, he became a regular starter during his first campaign, appearing in 23 league games and scoring three goals, one of them in a 3–1 home win against former club Santos. He announced his retirement from the fields on December 13, 2019.

Accident
Neto was one of six survivors of LaMia Airlines Flight 2933, which crashed in Colombia on 28 November 2016, killing 71 other passengers. Despite having several injuries when rescued, he underwent surgeries and doctors said he may be able to resume his career, according to the player's father. He was named in the squad for Chape's first Copa Libertadores tie in March 2017. Neto retired in 2019, saying "the pain outweighed the pleasure".

Post-playing career
In January 2020, it was announced that Neto would take over as the football superintendent of Chapecoense, following his retirement.

Career statistics

Honours
Chapecoense
 Campeonato Catarinense: 2016
 Copa Sudamericana: 2016

References

1985 births
Living people
Footballers from Rio de Janeiro (city)
Brazilian footballers
Association football defenders
Campeonato Brasileiro Série A players
Campeonato Brasileiro Série B players
Campeonato Brasileiro Série D players
Guarani FC players
Clube Atlético Metropolitano players
Santos FC players
Associação Chapecoense de Futebol players
Survivors of aviation accidents or incidents
LaMia Flight 2933